Linda Marcia Lee (born 24 July 1947) is a Canadian bridge player and  co-owner of Master Point Press, the world's leading publisher of books on bridge. After a lengthy absence from women's bridge, she won back-to-back Canadian Women's Teams titles in 2004 and 2005, and represented Canada in the Women's World Championship in both those years and in 2007. Lee is from Toronto, Ontario.

Linda is a World Bridge Federation (WBF) World International Master (WIM).

Bridge contributions
Linda Lee is a regular commentator on Bridge Base Online and she blogs regularly at her blog website at Linda.BridgeBlogging.com, a free bridge blog website created and sponsored by Master Point Press.

Bridge accomplishments

Wins

Runners-up

 North American Bridge Championships (1)
 Rockwell Mixed Pairs (1) 1992

References

External links 
 BridgeBlogging
 
 
  

1947 births
Living people
Canadian contract bridge players
Contract bridge writers
Canadian book publishers (people)
Sportspeople from Toronto
Writers from Toronto
Women book publishers (people)
Businesspeople from Toronto
Place of birth missing (living people)